Belt Publishing is an independent press founded in 2013 in Cleveland, Ohio. Originally a publisher of anthologies about Rust Belt cities, since 2015 Belt has since moved into publishing a wider scope of both fiction and nonfiction, with a particular focus on urbanism, history and narratives about the Rust Belt and the Midwest. Belt has been described as "promot[ing] a kind of progressive Rust Belt pride without succumbing to cliché or hipster irony" in the New York Times, and "serv[ing] as a thoughtful foil to national-media characterizations of the region as either hopelessly dystopic or cheerfully rebounding, sticking instead to a knotty middle" in the Chicago Tribune.

References

External links 
 Official website

2013 establishments in Ohio
Companies based in Cleveland
Small press publishing companies
Publishing companies of the United States
Mass media in Cleveland